Elements is the second solo album from Deep Purple bassist Roger Glover. It was recorded in early 1977 but wasn't released until April 1978 on PolyGram Records. The album's main concept is based on the four elements.

Track listing
 "The First Ring Made of Clay" (Roger Glover) 7:45
 "The Next a Ring of Fire" (Glover) 9:45
 "The Third Ring's Watery Flow" (Glover) 9:00
 "The Fourth Ring with the Wind" (Glover, Martin Birch) 6:33
 "Finale" (Glover, Birch) 2:17

Personnel
 Roger Glover: ARP 2600 Synthesizer, Oberheim polyphonic synthesizer, bass guitar, percussion, tabla, sitar guitar, acoustic guitar, vibes, backing vocals
 Simon Phillips: drums, tabla, percussion
 Micky Lee Soule: Piano, organ, percussion
 : Electric violin, clarinet
 Ronnie Aspery: Saxophone, flute
 Martin Birch: Acoustic guitar, backing vocals
 Liza Strike: Lead Vocals
 Helen Chappelle: Lead Vocals
 The Munich Philharmonic conducted by Graham Preskett

Production notes
 Produced by Martin Birch and Roger Glover
 Recorded and mixed at Musicland Studios, Munich, Germany, 1977
 Engineered by Martin Birch assisted by Hans Menzel
 Mastered at Sterling Sound, New York by Greg Calbi

Notes 

1978 albums
Albums produced by Martin Birch
Albums produced by Roger Glover
PolyGram albums
Roger Glover albums